The 1909 Kansas Jayhawks football team was an American football team that represented the University of Kansas as a member of the Missouri Valley Conference (MVC) during the 1909 college football season. In their sixth season under head coach A. R. Kennedy, the Jayhawks compiled an 8–1 record (3–1 against conference opponents), finished in second place in the conference, and outscored opponents by a total of 172 to 22. The Jayhawks played their home games at McCook Field in Lawrence, Kansas. Carl Pleasant was the team captain.

Schedule

References

Kansas
Kansas Jayhawks football seasons
Kansas Jayhawks football